The 1920 New Zealand Royal Visit Honours were appointments by George V of New Zealanders to the Royal Victorian Order, to mark the visit of the Prince of Wales to New Zealand that year. The recipients were invested by the prince at a dinner aboard HMS Renown in Lyttelton Harbour on 21 March 1920.

The recipients of honours are displayed here as they were styled before their new honour.

Royal Victorian Order

Knight Commander (KCVO)
 Major-General Sir Edward Walter Clerveaux Chaytor  – Commandant, New Zealand Military Forces.
 Sir William Fraser – Minister of Mines

Member, fourth class (MVO)
 Gavin Macaulay Hamilton – secretary to the governor-general.
 James Hislop  – under-secretary, Department of Internal Affairs.
 Richard William McVilly – general manager, New Zealand Railways.
 John O'Donovan – commissioner of police, Wellington.
 Captain Arthur Tahu Gravenor Rhodes – Grenadier Guards; military secretary to the governor-general.
 Lieutenant-Colonel James Lewis Sleeman  – Royal Sussex Regiment; director of military training, Wellington.

In 1984, Members of the Royal Victorian Order, fourth class, were redesignated as Lieutenants of the Royal Victorian Order (LVO).

References

1920 awards
Royal Visit Honours
Monarchy in New Zealand